Theo Devaney (born 25 August 1984) is an English actor best known for his portrayal of Gavin MacLeod in Supernatural (2014-2017) and Simon in A Christmas Prince (2017), A Christmas Prince: The Royal Wedding (2018), and A Christmas Prince: The Royal Baby (2019). In 2011 for The Witcher 2: Assassins of Kings he is the voice of Aryan La Valette.

Education 
Born in London, Devaney graduated from a three-year Professional Acting training at the Oxford School of Drama in 2005.

Filmography

Film

Television

References

English actors
Living people
1984 births